The Aviator is a historical sculpture located on the University of Virginia campus near Charlottesville, Albemarle County, Virginia.

History
The sculpture is a bronze statue commissioned in honor of University alumnus, James Rogers McConnell’s heroism and courage in World War I, as a member of the Lafayette Escadrille.

The Aviator was designed by Gutzon Borglum and dedicated in 1919.  
The sculpture measures 12 feet high and 8 feet, 6 inches wide.

It is located in front of Clemons Library on the grounds of the University of Virginia.  Due to the library's abundant 24-hour study space available for students, The Aviator is a fixture in everyday life at the University.

It is an athletic male nude with his feet placed shoulder width apart, knees slightly bent and arms outstretched supporting a pair of wings.  The blade/knife; dirk or possible dagger/stiletto the figure has in his sheath is a recognized symbol of masculinity.

It was added to the National Register of Historic Places in 2006.

Gallery

References

Bronze sculptures in Virginia
Buildings and structures in Albemarle County, Virginia
National Register of Historic Places in Albemarle County, Virginia
University of Virginia
Outdoor sculptures in Charlottesville, Virginia
1919 establishments in Virginia
Statues in Virginia
1919 sculptures
Sculptures of men in Virginia
Nude sculptures in the United States
Sculptures by Gutzon Borglum
Aviation art